The Guam Department of Land Management (DLM) is a department of the government on the United States territory of Guam. The department has its headquarters in the Guam International Trade Center (ITC) Building in Tamuning.

References

External links
 Guam Department of Land Management

website: http://www.dlm.guam.gov/

Government of Guam